Manuel Ruiz Zorrilla (22 March 183313 June 1895) was a Spanish politician. He served as Prime Minister of Spain for a little over ten weeks, in the summer of 1871, and again for eight months, between June 1872 and February 1873.

Biography
Born in Burgo de Osma, he was educated at Valladolid and studied law at the Central University of Madrid, where he leaned towards radicalism in politics. In 1856, he was elected deputy and soon attracted notice among the most advanced Progressists and Democrats.

Ruiz Zorrilla took part in the revolutionary propaganda that led to the military movement in Madrid on 22 June 1866. He had to take refuge in France for two years, like his fellow conspirators, but he returned to Spain when the revolution of 1868 took place. He was one of the members of the first cabinet after the revolution, and in 1869, under the regency of Marshal Serrano, he became Minister of Grace and Justice. In 1870, he was elected President of the Congress of Deputies and seconded Juan Prim in offering the throne to Amadeus of Savoy. He went to Italy as President of the Commission and carried, to the Prince at Florence, the official news of his election.

Initiated as Freemason in the Mantuana Lodge in Madrid by July 1870, Ruiz Zorrilla (symbol: Cavour; degree: 33) barely took days to become Grand Master of the  Grand Lodge in a process full of irregularities, serving in that capacity until 1 January 1874. Ruiz Zorrilla did not actually preside over nor attend the meetings, and successively delegated the chair of the lodge to Simón Gris Benítez,  and José Carvajal.

On the arrival of Amadeus in Spain, Ruiz Zorrilla became Minister of Public Works for a short time before resigning in protest against Serrano and Topete entering the councils of the new king. Six months later, in 1871, he was invited by Amadeus to form a cabinet, and he continued to be the principal councillor of the king until February 1873, when the monarch abdicated.

After the departure of Amadeus, Ruiz Zorrilla advocated the establishment of a republic, but he was not called upon either by the Federal Republicans to help them during 1873 or by Marshal Serrano in 1874 to join Martos and Sagasta in his cabinet. Immediately after the Restoration of the monarchy, early in 1875, Ruiz Zorrilla again went to France.

He was for nearly 18 years the soul of the republican conspiracies, the prompter of revolutionary propaganda and the chief inspirer of intrigues concerted by discontented military men of all ranks. He gave so much trouble to the Madrid governments that they organized a watch over him with the assistance of the French government and police, especially when it was discovered that the two military movements of August 1883 and September 1886 had been prepared and assisted by him. During the last two years of his life, he became less active. Failing health and the loss of his wife had decreased his energies, and the Madrid government allowed him to return to Spain some months before he died at Burgos, of heart disease.

Notes

References
Citations
Bibliography

 
 
Attribution

1833 births
1895 deaths
People from the Province of Soria
Prime Ministers of Spain
Presidents of the Congress of Deputies (Spain)
Complutense University of Madrid alumni
Liberal Union (Spain) politicians
Justice ministers of Spain
Spanish Freemasons
Leaders of political parties in Spain
Exiled Spanish politicians
Spanish republicans